The 1977 All-Ireland Minor Hurling Championship was the 47th staging of the All-Ireland Minor Hurling Championship since its establishment by the Gaelic Athletic Association in 1928.

Tipperary entered the championship as the defending champions, however, they were beaten by Clare in the Munster quarter-final.

On 9 October 1977 Kilkenny won the championship following a 1-8 to 0-9 defeat of Cork in a replay of the All-Ireland final. This was their 11th All-Ireland title and their first in two championship seasons.

Results

Leinster Minor Hurling Championship

First round

Quarter-finals

Semi-finals

Final

Munster Minor Hurling Championship

First round

Semi-finals

Final

All-Ireland Minor Hurling Championship

Semi-final

Finals

Championship statistics

Miscellaneous

 The All-Ireland final ended in a draw for the first time since 1966.

External links
 All-Ireland Minor Hurling Championship: Roll Of Honour

Minor
All-Ireland Minor Hurling Championship